is a railway station on the Taita Line in the city of Tajimi, Gifu Prefecture, Japan, operated by Central Japan Railway Company (JR Tōkai).

Lines

Station layout
Hime Station has two opposed ground-level side platforms connected by a level crossing. The station is unattended.

Platforms

Adjacent stations

|-
!colspan=5|JR Central

History
Hime Station opened on December 28, 1918, as a station on the Tōnō Railway. The station was absorbed into the JR Tōkai network upon the privatization of the Japanese National Railways (JNR) on April 1, 1987. A new station building was completed in 2006.

Passenger statistics
In fiscal 2016, the station was used by an average of 389 passengers daily (boarding passengers only).

Surrounding area
 Hime Post Office
 Minami-Hime Middle School
 Minami Hime Elementary School

See also
 List of Railway Stations in Japan

References

External links

Railway stations in Gifu Prefecture
Taita Line
Railway stations in Japan opened in 1918
Stations of Central Japan Railway Company
Tajimi, Gifu